Coptotriche concolor is a moth of the  family Tischeriidae. It was described by Zeller in 1875. It is found in Arkansas, the District of Columbia, Illinois, Texas and Virginia.

The larvae feed on Quercus species. They mine the leaves of their host plant.

References

Moths described in 1875
Tischeriidae